Yushan is a district of the city of Ma'anshan, Anhui Province, China.

Administrative divisions
Yushan District has 4 Subdistricts, 2 towns and 1 township.
4 Subdistricts
 Pinghu Subdistrict
 Anmin Subdistrict
 Yushan Subdistrict
 Caishi Subdistrict

2 Towns
 Xiangshan
 Yintang

1 Township
 Jiashan Township

References

Ma'anshan
County-level divisions of Anhui